Anna Rogowska (born 21 May 1981) is a retired Polish athlete who specialised in the pole vault. She became the World Champion in 2009 in Berlin.

Career
Born  in Gdynia, she won the bronze medal at the 2004 Olympics, narrowly beating Monika Pyrek, another Polish pole vaulter born in Gdynia. Early 2005 brought success as she won the silver medal in the European Indoor Championships. On July 22, 2005, in London, she achieved a personal best with 4.80 m, which was also the Polish record. Minutes later she saw Yelena Isinbayeva become the first woman to clear 5.00 m.

Rogowska was among the contenders for a medal in the 2005 World Championships. She finished sixth, however, jumping only 4.35 m under challenging weather conditions.

On August 26, 2005, she achieved another personal best with 4.83 m (new Polish record). This was on the Memorial van Damme.  She also holds the Polish indoor record of 4.85 m, set on 6 March 2011.

She announced her retirement from the sport on 27 February 2015.

For her sport achievements, she received:
 Golden Cross of Merit in 2004.
 Knight's Cross of the Order of Polonia Restituta (5th Class) in 2009.

Competition record

NM = No Mark
At the 2012 London Olympic Games, Rogowska reached the final by clearing 4.55m, but in the final she failed to register a mark, fouling three times at her opening height of 4.45 m.

References

External links

 Official webpage 
 

1981 births
Living people
Polish female pole vaulters
Athletes (track and field) at the 2004 Summer Olympics
Athletes (track and field) at the 2008 Summer Olympics
Athletes (track and field) at the 2012 Summer Olympics
Olympic athletes of Poland
Olympic bronze medalists for Poland
Sportspeople from Gdynia
Knights of the Order of Polonia Restituta
Recipients of the Gold Cross of Merit (Poland)
World Athletics Championships medalists
Medalists at the 2004 Summer Olympics
Olympic bronze medalists in athletics (track and field)
World Athletics Championships winners